Publicus may refer to :

The Ager publicus is the Latin language name for the public land of the Roman Republic and Empire.
Cursus publicus was the courier service of the Roman Empire.

See also
Publius (disambiguation)